Jim Creek is a stream in Caldwell County in the U.S. state of Missouri. It is a tributary of Mill Creek.

Jim Creek most likely was named after an early settler.

See also
List of rivers of Missouri

References

Rivers of Caldwell County, Missouri
Rivers of Missouri